Cascade is an unincorporated community in Cherry County, Nebraska, United States.

History
A post office was established at Cascade in 1899, and remained in operation until it was discontinued in 1955.

References

Unincorporated communities in Cherry County, Nebraska
Unincorporated communities in Nebraska